Daneshgah-e Tarbiat Modares Metro Station is a station in Tehran Metro Line 7. It is located on the intersection of Chamran Expressway and Jalal-e-Ale Ahmad Expressway, near its namesake Tarbiat Modares University.

References

Tehran Metro stations